Lino Zecchini (born 8 December 1928) is an Italian alpine skier. He competed in the men's downhill at the 1956 Winter Olympics in which he did not place.

References

1928 births
Living people
Italian male alpine skiers
Olympic alpine skiers of Italy
Alpine skiers at the 1956 Winter Olympics